The Jacques-Gabriel Bridge (named pont Jacques-Gabriel in French) spans the Loire river in Blois, France, since the beginning of the 18th century. With a total length of 283m, it is made up of 11 arches, and is the last  arch bridge on the river that is pointed. Since its construction, the edifice holds the name of the architect who designed it, Jacques Gabriel. The bridge was partially destroyed three times: in 1870 (Franco-Prussian War), 1940 and 1944 (World War II). It is now crossed by the Route Nationale 156.

The bridge was listed as a historical monument by order of 22 April 1937.

Location 

The bridge spans the Loire river in the middle of Blois, between the downtown (from the same axis of the Denis Papin staircase) and Vienne on the left bank (aligned to Wilson Avenue).

History

Construction of a new Bloisian bridge 

Since the 11st century, a stone bridge was used to link both banks. In the night between 6 and 7 February 1716, this medieval bridge collapsed.

The construction of a new bridge is decided by August 1716. The project management is given by Duke Philippe of Orléans to Jacques Gabriel, yet King Louis XVI's official architect. As early as the end of that year, a regiment from Piedmont is called to build the bridge. The infrastructure is inaugurated on 4 May 1724, with an 14.6m-high obelisk standing in its middle.

Pictures

References 

Arch bridges in France
Transport infrastructure completed in 1724
Blois
Monuments historiques of Centre-Val de Loire
Buildings and structures in Loir-et-Cher